Mohammed bin Saud Abu-Nogta (born 1965) was a Saudi politician and  Governor of Mahayel, Saudi Arabia since 19 May 2015 to his death . He has previously served as a member of the 'Asir Region communal council.

He was Governor of Bisha from 23 May 2012 to 18 May 2015. He also served as governor of Rijal Alma from 26 January 2007 to 22 May 2012.

Early life
Al-Mathami is from Wadi Tabab and belongs to the Asir Tribe. Grandson of "Abd al-Wahhab Abu Nuqta", Emir of Asir. He was born on 25 October 1965. . He did his early education in Abha, and holds a certificate in Public relations from King Abdulaziz University.

References

1964 births
Living people
King Abdulaziz University alumni